Ádám Gyurcsó (born 6 March 1991) is a Hungarian professional footballer who currently plays as a winger for AEK Larnaca.

Club career

Videoton
In the 2010–2011 season, he played for the second team of Videoton FC. With 10 goals and 14 assists, he was a key player in a great season. He made his first team debut on 15 March 2011 in a Magyar Kupa match against Budapest Honvéd FC and scored off the bench in a 4–0 win. He made his first team league debut for Videoton on 22 May 2011, coming off the bench in a 1–0 loss to Újpest FC.

In the following season, he was loaned to Kecskeméti TE. After six months on loan, scoring four goals and making four assist, Videoton FC brought him back to the club. He finished the season with six goals and ten assists in Hungarian top flight.

In the 2014–15 season, Gyurcsó scored 6 goals and made 18 assists as Videoton won the Hungarian league.

Pogoń Szczecin
On 5 January 2016, Gyurcsó was signed by Ekstraklasa club Pogoń Szczecin. He debuted in a 3–2 win against Korona Kielce at the Stadion Florian Krygier on 15 February 2016 in the 2015-16 Ekstraklasa season by scoring the winning goal in the 78th minute.

Hajduk Split 
In January 2018, Gyurcsó joined Prva HNL side Hajduk Split on a six-month loan deal with an option to buy. He scored his first Hajduk goal in a 1–0 win over NK Rudeš on 3 March 2018. In May 2018, Hajduk activated a buy-out clause to sign the player on a permanent basis for the next 3 years.

Puskás Akadémia (loan) 
On 10 August 2020, Gyurcsó moved to Hungarian side Puskás Akadémia, on a loan deal.

NK Osijek 
On 15 February 2021, Gyurcsó terminated his contract with Hajduk Split, and signed as a free-agent with Prva HNL side NK Osijek.

Club statistics

International career
On 1 June 2012, he made his international debut for Hungary as he came on as a substitute against Czech Republic in the 65th minute, where he scored the winning goal. Three days later he started in a match against Ireland.

On 10 October 2016 Gyurcsó scored his first goal in the 2018 FIFA World Cup qualification – UEFA Group B match against Latvia at the Skonto Stadium, Riga, Latvia.

Career statistics

International goals

References

External links
Player profile at HLSZ 

1991 births
Living people
People from Tatabánya
Hungarian footballers
Hungary international footballers
Hungary under-21 international footballers
Hungarian expatriate footballers
Association football forwards
Fehérvár FC players
Pogoń Szczecin players
Kecskeméti TE players
HNK Hajduk Split players
Puskás Akadémia FC players
Nemzeti Bajnokság I players
Ekstraklasa players
Croatian Football League players
Expatriate footballers in Poland
Expatriate footballers in Croatia
Sportspeople from Komárom-Esztergom County